Kenmore Henderson Hughes (born 6 July 1970) is a retired sprinter from Antigua and Barbuda who competed primarily in the 400 metres. He represented his country at the 1992 Summer Olympics, as well as four World Championships.

His personal best in the event is 46.83 seconds set in 2001.

Competition record

References

1970 births
Living people
Antigua and Barbuda male sprinters
Olympic athletes of Antigua and Barbuda
Athletes (track and field) at the 1992 Summer Olympics
Commonwealth Games competitors for Antigua and Barbuda
Athletes (track and field) at the 1994 Commonwealth Games
Pan American Games competitors for Antigua and Barbuda
Athletes (track and field) at the 1999 Pan American Games
World Athletics Championships athletes for Antigua and Barbuda